Grand River Hospital is a hospital located in Kitchener, Ontario, Canada. The hospital operates two campuses, Kitchener-Waterloo Health Centre and Freeport Health Centre, which were independent hospitals that merged to form Grand River Hospital in April 1995.

The hospital has over 650 beds and 15 specialized programs and services: surgery, children's program, childbirth, medical imaging, mental health and addictions, withdrawal management, medicine, stroke, complex continuing care, rehabilitation, cancer, critical care, renal, emergency, pharmacy and lab. The hospital also provides renal dialysis and cancer satellite programs in Guelph, Palmerston, Fergus and Mt Forest Centre in Guelph, along with the Hazelglen Outreach Mental Health service in Kitchener.

On September 22, 2019, Grand River Hospital integrated all of their systems into a new central computer system in order to improve efficiency for patient care.

Hospitals

KW Site
The KW Site of Grand River Hospital was previously known as the K-W Health Centre and the Berlin-Waterloo Hospital. It is located on King Street West, near the Waterloo border, the Ion rapid transit light rail station and the CTV Kitchener studios. It was founded in 1895 on land donated by entrepreneur Joseph E. Seagram. The Grand River Regional Cancer Centre opened at this site in 2003. The site is supported by the Kitchener Helipad located southeast at the corner of Walter Street and Wellington Street South.

Freeport Site
The Freeport Site of Grand River Hospital was previously known as the Freeport Sanitorium. It is located on King Street East on the shore of the Grand River. It was a tuberculosis sanatorium in the early 20th century, and in the late 1980s was transformed into a regional chronic care facility, as a new structure was built onto the previous one, expanding it. Complex continuing care, rehabilitation and the Waterloo-Wellington breast centre are located at this site. In November 2010, a new Specialized Mental Health program opened at Freeport, with all clinical practice based on the Recovery philosophy. This service is for patients living with severe and persistent mental illness, who would have previously been sent to London, Ontario.

The unique architecture of Freeport Centre is award winning; "its overall planning concept of simulating a village, complete with a courtyard cum town square, [distinguishes] it from many of its predecessors in long-term care architecture." This has made it attractive as a filming location, as seen in two movies, Away from Her, directed by Sarah Polley; and Cold Creek Manor, directed by Mike Figgis.

Mental health 
Withdrawal Management, located near the KW site at 52 Glasgow, Grand River Hospital supports the only withdrawal management centre within Waterloo-Wellington Regions. This facility has 24 hour monitoring of non-medical withdrawal for men and women, and a day program to help individuals maintain abstinence and help to transition to other community supports.

References

Hospitals in Kitchener, Ontario
Hospital buildings completed in 2003
Hospitals established in 1995
Heliports in Ontario
Certified airports in Ontario